Keshav Prasad Badal (born October 1952, in Kavre District) is a Nepalese politician.

Badal obtained his Bachelor of Economics degree from Tribhuvan University. He studied at Tri-Chandra Campus in Kathmandu.

Encounters with feudal rule in the 1960s radicalized the young Badal. He became a political activist in 1969. As of 1976 he was part of the central leadership of the Proletarian Revolutionary Organisation, Nepal. He was put in charge of leading the organisation in the Narayani, Janakpur and Bagmati zones. In 1978 he became a member of the Nepal Workers Peasants Organisation, in 1981 he was included in the politburo of the organisation (presumably of the Sharma faction, later D.P. Singh faction). After the merger of the D.P. Singh group with the Communist Party of Nepal (Marxist-Leninist) (CPN(ML)), Badal became secretary of the Kavre District Committee and a member of the Bagmati Zonal Committee of CPN(ML).

Badal was elected Bagmati Zonal Committee as incharge  and Alternate Central Committee Member at the 4th congress of CPN(ML) in 1990. As the leader of the party in the Bagmati zone, he played a key role in the 1990 Jana Andolan ('People's Movement'). The third national conference of the All Nepal Peasants Association elected him as its general secretary.

After the foundation of the Communist Party of Nepal (Unified Marxist-Leninist) (CPN(UML)), Badal was made secretary of the Kavre District Committee of the party and included in its National Council.

Badal was elected to the Pratinidhi Sabha (House of Representatives) in the 1991 general election from the Kavre-2 constituency. He obtained 16,325 votes. He retained his seat in the 1994 general election, obtaining 19,938 votes. Badal chaired the 1995-1996 High
Level Land Reform Commission (which became popularly known as the 'Badal Commission'). The report of the Badal Commission proposed measures for promoting access to agricultural lands to poor peasants.

In March 1997 he was named Minister of Industries. He lost his parliamentary seat in the 1999 general election, being defeated by Shiv Prasad Humagain of the Nepali Congress. Badal obtained 24,401 votes.

As of 2012 he served as chairman of the National Cooperative Federation, Nepal (NCFN). As of 2013 he served as commissioner of the Commission for the Investigation of Abuse of Authority (CIAA).

References

1948 births
Communist Party of Nepal (Unified Marxist–Leninist) politicians
Living people
Tribhuvan University alumni
People from Kavrepalanchok District
Nepal MPs 1991–1994
Nepal MPs 1994–1999